Conopea is a genus of barnacle, containing the following species:

 Conopea acuta (Nilsson-Cantell, 1921)
 Conopea basicuneata Van Syoc, Carrison-Stone, Madrona & Williams, 2014
 Conopea calceola (Ellis, 1758)
 Conopea cornuta (Hoek, 1913)
 Conopea cymbiformis (Darwin, 1854)
 Conopea exothobasis Van Syoc, Carrison-Stone, Madrona & Williams, 2014
 Conopea fidelis Carrison-Stone, Van Syoc, Williams & Simison, 2013
 Conopea galeata (Linnaeus, 1771) (seawhip barnacle)
 Conopea granulata (Hiro, 1937)
 Conopea investita (Hoek, 1913)
 Conopea margaretae Van Syoc, Carrison-Stone, Madrona & Williams, 2014
 Conopea minyrostrum Van Syoc, Carrison-Stone, Madrona & Williams, 2014
 Conopea mjobergi Broch, 1916
 Conopea propriens (Hoek, 1913)
 Conopea sabangensis Van Syoc, Carrison-Stone, Madrona & Williams, 2014
 Conopea saotomensis Carrison-Stone, Van Syoc, Williams & Simison, 2013
 Conopea scandens (Pilsbry, 1916)
 Conopea sinensis (Ren & Liu, 1978)
 Conopea titani Kolbasov, Chan, Molodtsova & Achituv, 2016
 Conopea willhearsti Van Syoc, Carrison-Stone, Madrona & Williams, 2014
 † Conopea bacata Carriol & Schneider, 2016

References

Further reading

Archaeobalanidae
Maxillopoda genera
Taxa named by Thomas Say